HD 93129 is a triple star system in the Carina Nebula, with all three components being hot O class stars amongst the most luminous stars in the Milky Way. It is the dominant member of the Trumpler 14 star cluster, a young star cluster within the Carina OB1 stellar association that harbors other super-luminous stars, like Eta Carinae and WR 25.

Location

HD 93129 is found at the centre of the massive Trumpler 14 open cluster in the Carina Nebula star forming region. It is too far away for its distance to have been accurately determined using the annual parallax method, but accurate distances for η Carinae and the Homunculus Nebula, modelling of clusters, and astrophysical data about other stars assumed to be within the same region, all lead to a distance around 2,300 parsecs. HD 93129 Aa is the closest O2 supergiant to Earth.

That volume of space is home to many other massive and luminous stars. HD 93128, yet another O3.5 main sequence star, is only 24' away within Trumpler 14, and HD 93250 and HD 93205 are two more O3.5 stars in the larger Trumpler 16 cluster around η Carinae. There are also three Wolf-Rayet stars, an O4 supergiant, many other class O stars, and the unique η Carinae itself.

System

HD 93129 consists of two clearly resolved components, HD 93129 A and HD 93129 B, and HD 93129 A itself is made up of two much closer stars.

HD 93129 A has been resolved into two components. The spectrum is dominated by the brighter component, although the secondary is only 0.9 magnitudes fainter.  HD 93129 Aa is an O2 supergiant and Ab is an O3.5 main sequence star. Their separation has decreased from 55 mas in 2004 to only 27 mas in 2013, but an accurate orbit is not available.

HD 93129 B is an O3.5 main-sequence star 3 arc-seconds away from the closer pair. It is about 1.5 magnitudes fainter than the combined HD 93129 A, and approximately the same brightness as HD 93129 Ab.

A further 5 fainter stars within 5 arc-seconds have been detected, between five and seven magnitudes fainter at infrared wavelengths.

Properties

HD 93129Aa has left the main sequence and its age is estimated to be around 900,000 years. The existence of the zero-age main sequence stars within Trumpler 14 suggest its age may be less than 600,000 years.

See also
Trumpler 14
Mystic Mountain

References

External links
 http://jumk.de/astronomie/big-stars/hd-93129a.shtml

Carina (constellation)
Carina Nebula
093129A
114507
Durchmusterung objects
O-type supergiants
O-type main-sequence stars
Emission-line stars
Spectroscopic binaries
Triple star systems